The Ornate snake eel (Herpetoichthys regius, also known as the sea snake in St. Helena) is an eel in the family Ophichthidae (worm/snake eels). It was described by John Richardson in 1848, originally under the genus Ophisurus. It is a marine, tropical eel which is known from the eastern Atlantic Ocean, including Mauritania, St. Helena, and India. It inhabits the continental shelf, where it forms burrows in sand sediments.

References

Fish described in 1848
Ophichthidae